Kathy McEdwards (born August 16, 1957 in Hamilton, Ontario) is a Canadian curler from Dundas, Ontario.

At the time of the 1986 World Championships, she worked in the sales department for The Hamilton Spectator.

Teams and events

References

External links
 
 Kathy McEdwards – Curling Canada Stats Archive

1957 births
Living people
Curlers from Hamilton, Ontario
Canadian women curlers
Canadian women's curling champions
People from Dundas, Ontario
World curling champions